United Nations Security Council Resolution 201, adopted unanimously on March 19, 1965, after reaffirming its previous resolutions on the topic and thanking all that nations who had contributed to it, extended the stationing of the United Nations Peacekeeping Force in Cyprus for another three months, to end on June 26, 1965.

See also
Cyprus dispute
List of United Nations Security Council Resolutions 201 to 300 (1965–1971)

References

Text of the Resolution at undocs.org

External links
 

 0201
 0201
1965 in Cyprus
March 1965 events